Park is a Metropolitan Borough of Sefton ward in the Sefton Central Parliamentary constituency that covers the villages of Sefton, Lunt, Lydiate and the western part of the town of Maghull, England.

Councillors

Election results

Elections of the 2010s

References

Wards of the Metropolitan Borough of Sefton